Tetra-n-butylammonium iodide (TBAI) is a quaternary ammonium salt with an iodide counterion. It is used for synthesizing tetra-n-butylammonium triiodide by mixing with iodine.

Properties
The solid crystal of tetra-n-butylammonium iodide is in the monoclinic crystal system. It has space group C2/c. The unit cell has dimensions a=14.2806 b=14.1864 c=19.5951 β=111.149. There are eight formulae in the unit cell (Z=8), which has volume 3702.4 Å3.

The enthalpy of formation ΔfH0 of tetra-n-butylammonium iodide is −499 kJ/mol, which is lower than that for the bromide or chloride (−540, −564 kJ/mol).

At lower temperatures with water tetra-n-butylammonium iodide forms a clathrate hydrate. The tetra-n-butylammonium cation is large and hydrophobic. The absolute enthalpy of hydration (from gas phase) is −260 kJ/mol.

The He(I) photoelectron spectrum of tetra-n-butylammonium iodide contains a peak at 11 eV due to the tetra-n-butylammonium cation, and at 7 and 8 eV due to iodide.

See also 
 Iodide
 Tetrabutylammonium triiodide

References 

Iodides
Tetrabutylammonium salts